Gracilocala bicolor is a species of beetle in the family Buprestidae, the only species in the genus Gracilocala.

References

Buprestidae

Beetles described in 2006